Stosicia fernandezgarcesi is a species of minute sea snail, a marine gastropod mollusk or micromollusk in the family Zebinidae.

Description
The height of the shell attains 4 mm.

Distribution
This species occurs in the Caribbean Sea off Cuba.

References

 Espinosa J. & Ortea J. (2002) Descripción de cuatro nuevas especies de la familia Rissoinidae (Mollusca: Gastropoda). Avicennia 15: 141-146 page(s): 144

fernandezgarcesi
Gastropods described in 2002